Jean Bart was a  anti-air frigate of the French Marine Nationale. She was the eighth vessel of the French Navy named after the privateer Jean Bart. She was commissioned on 3 March 1991.

Jean Bart was fitted with a number of types of prototype equipment which were later incorporated in the  frigates. The vessel was withdrawn from service in August 2021.

Service history
On 12 April 2008, Jean Bart aided the capture of the pirates who had taken over the luxury yacht . She took part in Operation Unified Protector until she returned to her home port Toulon in April 2011.

In October 2014, Jean Bart entered the US Fifth Fleet and joined up with CTF 50 for Opération Chammal.

On 11 October 2019, Jean Bart, accompanied by the Royal Navy frigate , intercepted a suspicious dhow in the Arabian Sea and seized  of illegal narcotics.

From 4 May to 1 June 2020, Jean Bart participated in the European Union's Operation Irini, enforcing the arms embargo on Libya. The frigate returned to Toulon from her deployment to the Indian Ocean in March 2021 and had been expected to decommission in Spring 2021 to be replaced by the FREMM-class frigate . However, it was subsequently announced that the frigate would remain in service temporarily and deploy on one final mission to Greece in April to demonstrate her capabilities in the context of a French offer to transfer her to the Hellenic Navy. After the Greek Government elected not to acquire her, Jean Bart was decommissioned on 31 August 2021.

References

Frigates of France
Cassard-class frigates
Ships built in France
1988 ships